M1132 Engineer Squad Vehicle (ESV) is the combat engineering variant of the Stryker wheeled armored fighting vehicle. It is issued to combat engineer squads in the US Army Stryker brigade combat teams. Models with the double V-hull upgrade are known as the M1257 ESVV.

Its purpose is to transport and support combat engineers on the battlefield; the vehicle includes obstacle clearing and lane marking systems as well as mine detection devices.

The engineer vehicle is based on the infantry carrier. Its most distinctive feature is a mine-clearance blade, it is most often towing a wheeled trailer loaded with additional equipment. The vehicle is capable of clearing mines on paved surfaces and some rubble clearance. Other mobility tasks can be completed by the mounted engineer squad with the tools on the vehicle and trailer.

See also
 List of U.S. military vehicles by model number

References

This article incorporates work from https://web.archive.org/web/20080516205906/http://www.sbct.army.mil/product_esv.html, which is in the public domain as it is a work of the United States Military.

External links

Military engineering vehicles of the United States
General Dynamics land vehicles
Wheeled armoured fighting vehicles
Post–Cold War armored fighting vehicles of the United States
Mowag Piranha